Akoursos is a village in the Paphos District of Cyprus, located 3 km south of Kathikas. Akoursos is located at 410 metres above sea level. It receives approximately 650 mm of rainfall annually.

Naming 
The name of the village means the “running water” in the Turkish language (Akarsu), and is a product of paraphrasing by the locals in 1958.

Places Nearby 
Finally, Akoursos is bordered by the tourist town of Pegia and the village of Kathikas.

References 

Communities in Paphos District